Forbrugsforeningen (The Consumption Society), also called FBF, is Denmark's oldest and largest loyalty club with more than 247,500 members. FBF is a non-profit organisation, that was established 20 April 1886 as Forbrugsforeningen af 1886.

FBF's product is a combined loyalty card and credit card to be used in shops and webshops to earn and accumulate bonuses, also called cashback. The size of bonuses varies from shop to shop. To become a member of FBF, one has to be a member of a trade union. There is a small membership fee.

Awards 
FBF won the title as best loyaltyclub in Denmark in 2015, primarily due to the ease of transparency when accumulating bonuses, regular cashbacks without a minimum amount.

References

External links 
 

Customer loyalty programs
Non-profit organizations based in Denmark
1886 establishments in Denmark
Organizations established in 1886